Suzam Uddin Laskar is an All India United Democratic Front politician from Assam. He has been elected in Assam Legislative Assembly election in 2016 from Katlicherra constituency defeating the heavyweight Congress Leader Gautam Roy. In 2021 election, Suzam Uddin Laskar again won in Katlicherra constituency.

References 

Living people
All India United Democratic Front politicians
Samajwadi Party politicians
Assam MLAs 2016–2021
People from Hailakandi district
Year of birth missing (living people)
Assam MLAs 2021–2026